The Polish Amateur Championship is an annual snooker competition played in Poland and is the highest ranking amateur event in Poland.

The competition was first established back in 1993. Rafał Jewtuch is the most successful champion in the tournaments history having won the competition in 1997, 2003, 2006 and 2008. The championship is currently held by Mateusz Baranowski, who won 5–1 over defending champion Konrad Juszczyszyn in the 2022 final.

Winners

References

Snooker amateur competitions
Snooker in Poland
Recurring sporting events established in 1993
Snooker
1993 establishments in Poland